Marion Bernice (née Carpenter) Yazdi (October 9, 1902 at Marcellus, Cass County, Michigan, – February 2, 1996 at Natick, Middlesex County, Massachusetts or at Wellesley, Norfolk County, Massachusetts,) was the first adherent of the Baháʼí Faith to attend the University of California at Berkeley, and at Stanford University.  She was a daughter of Crowell E. and Elizabeth Carpenter, natives of Michigan and Ohio, respectively, who moved from Schoolcraft, Kalamazoo County, Michigan to Santa Paula, Ventura County, California between the 1910 and 1920 censuses.

She married in 1926 to Ali M. Yazdi (1899-1978), a native of Persia (Iran) who immigrated to the United States in 1920.  He was a civil engineer, and a noted Baháʼí writer and lecturer who served in the National Spiritual Assembly of the Baháʼís of the United States and as chairman of the Local Spiritual Assembly of Berkeley, California for 30 years.  His life and service were commemorated by Marion in her 1982 book, Youth in the Vanguard: Memoirs and Letters Collected by the First Baháʼí Student at Berkeley and at Stanford University.

See also
 Marion Holley, another Baháʼí student of Stanford and Berkeley

References

People from Natick, Massachusetts
Writers from Michigan
1902 births
1996 deaths
People from Cass County, Michigan
People from Santa Paula, California
American Bahá'ís
University of California, Berkeley alumni
Stanford University alumni
20th-century Bahá'ís
20th-century American women writers